Anthonique Strachan (born 22 August 1993) is a Bahamian sprinter, is the 2012 100m and 200m World Junior Champion. She competed at the 2012 Summer Olympics, 2016 Summer Olympics and the 2020 Summer Olympics, in 200 m. and 4 × 400 m relay

Career
She attended St. Augustine's College in Nassau, Bahamas, and trained with Club Monica Athletics. She trained  in Auburn, Alabama under coach Henry Rolle who also coached Kerron Stewart, Darrel Brown and Marc Burns, before moving to Kingston, Jamaica to train with MVP Track and Field Club under coach Stephen Francis.

At the 2011 CARIFTA Games, she won two gold medals (100 metres in 11.38s (−0.8 m/s), and 200 metres in 23.17s (0.0 m/s)) in the junior (U-20) category equalling Veronica Campbell's 200 metres games
record of 22.93s (1.1 m/s) in the heats.  She was consequently awarded the Austin Sealy Trophy for the most outstanding athlete of the games.

Strachan won gold medals over 200 metres and 4×100 metres relay at the 2011 Pan American Junior Athletics Championships. Her 200 metres time of 22.70 was a new World Junior Leading and a new championship record.

At the 2012 CARIFTA Games, she won three gold medals: 100 metres in wind-assisted 11.22s (4.4 m/s), 200 metres, this year improving Veronica Campbell's and her own 200 metres games record to 22.85s (−0.7 m/s), and finally, she led the Bahamas 4 × 100 m relay team to gold in 45.02s.  For the second time in the role, she was awarded the Austin Sealy Trophy for the most outstanding athlete of the games.

Strachan broke the 11 second barrier over 100m on April 26 in Kingston, Jamaica at the Wolmer Speedfest. Strachan placed first in a time of 10.99 (+0.5).

Achievements

References

External links

MVP Track Club

1993 births
Living people
Bahamian female sprinters
Athletes (track and field) at the 2012 Summer Olympics
Athletes (track and field) at the 2016 Summer Olympics
Olympic athletes of the Bahamas
Commonwealth Games competitors for the Bahamas
Athletes (track and field) at the 2014 Commonwealth Games
Athletes (track and field) at the 2018 Commonwealth Games
Athletes (track and field) at the 2015 Pan American Games
Athletes (track and field) at the 2019 Pan American Games
Pan American Games competitors for the Bahamas
Sportspeople from Nassau, Bahamas
Bahamian emigrants to the United States
Athletes (track and field) at the 2020 Summer Olympics
Olympic female sprinters
World Athletics U20 Championships winners